Donna Geils Orender (born February 14, 1957) is a sports executive and a former collegiate and professional basketball player. She was formerly president of the Women's National Basketball Association (WNBA), and senior vice president of the PGA.  Currently, Orender is the founder and CEO of Orender Unlimited, a Jacksonville, FL based advisory and consultancy firm.  She travels the world as a motivational speaker and advocating for the empowerment of women and young girls through her non-profit organization Generation W.

Early life
Orender was born in Long Island, New York, grew up in Queens, New York, and in Elmont, New York on Long Island, and is Jewish.  She belonged to a Conservative synagogue (the Elmont Jewish Center). She attended and played basketball for Elmont High School, in Elmont, New York, and was a five-sport athlete in high school, also lettering in field hockey, volleyball, softball, and tennis. According to Orender, Elmont High School did not have a girls’ tennis team while she was attending, so she asked the coach to play for the boys’ team. The coach agreed to let her try out for the team, and in doing so she beat her opponent and became the first girl to play tennis for the high school, which gained little attention to her surprise.

College years 
Orender turned down an academic scholarship to the University of Chicago to instead attend Queens College in New York City, New York to play basketball for Lucille Kyvallos.  Queens College was invited to play Immaculata at Madison Square Garden on February 22, 1975.  The matchup was the first ever college women's basketball game in the arena. Orender graduated from Queens College in 1978 with a bachelor's degree in psychology. While at Queens College she was an All-American basketball player.  In 2012 Orender was inducted into the Queens College Athletics Hall of Fame.

After graduating from Queens College, Orender attended Adelphi University to pursue her master's degree in social work. She dropped out of the program after one year to play professional basketball for the Women's Pro Basketball League (WBL). Adelphi University presented Orender with an honorary doctor of law degree in 2007.

Career

Women's Pro Basketball League (WBL) (1979–1981) 
Under the name Donna Geils, Orender played three seasons in the Women's Pro Basketball League (WBL), where she was an All-Star, and one of only 20 women to play in all three seasons of the league.  During that time, she played for the New York Stars (1978–79), New Jersey Gems (1979–80), and Chicago Hustle (1980–81). Orender's WBL career is featured in the book Mad Seasons: The Story of the First Women's Basketball League, 1978–1981, by Karra Porter (University of Nebraska Press, 2006).  The WBL was disbanded in 1981.

Orender still holds two records for most field goals made, and is currently ranked 34th with 249 field goals made in the 1979–1980 season and ranked 7th for most turnovers in a single season, with 191 also in the 1979–1980 season. Both records were set as a part of the New Jersey Gems. When the league shutdown in 1981, Orender wrote an article for The Times called "Making a Dream Come True, and Watching it Fade Away."

In 1985, she was the captain of the Team USA Women's Basketball Team at the 1985 Maccabiah Games in Israel.

Television production (1981–1987) 
Orender's television production career began as a production assistant at ABC Sports and continued at the Sports Channel. Orender also owned her own production and marketing company, Primo Donna Productions.

Professional Golfer's Association (PGA) Tour (1987–2005) 
In 1987, Orender started working for the PGA Tour, where she oversaw their global television and production businesses.  By 1989, she was the original producer of Inside the PGA Tour, a half-hour highlights show. In 1997 she negotiated a $400 million TV contract with the networks for the PGA Tour. In 2001, she became the senior vice president of strategic development in the Office of the Commissioner.  Orender spent 17 years with the PGA.

Women's National Basketball Association (WNBA) (2005–2011)  
In February 2005, Orender was named the new WNBA president,  succeeding Val Ackerman. Her responsibilities included the oversight of all league operations including both the business and competitive aspects of the league. During her tenure, she negotiated an eight-year contract extension with Disney/ABC/ESPN which, for the first time, included broadcast rights fees and a six-year Collective Bargaining agreement.  On December 3, 2010, it was announced that Orender would be stepping down from her post effective December 31, 2010. NBA Vice President Chris Granger was tabbed to replace her on an interim basis until Laurel Richie was the named the new president.

During her time with the organization Orender notes attendance growth, development on ESPN, and broadcast development are all highlights that she is proud to have played a role in.  In an interview with Jackson Daily Record Orender discusses her decision to step down as president was in part due to her twin sons. She wanted to be around for them as they were growing up, and as they needed her more.

Advocacy and entrepreneurship (2011–present)

Generation W   
In 2011, Orender registered and launched a 501c3, non-profit organization called Generation W. This non-profit organization is used to provide a platform to bring women together to educate, inspire, and connect through mentor-ship and national events. Orender became the CEO of Generation W when it was founded in 2011. Generation W is Orender's proudest professional accomplishment.

Orender Unlimited, LLC.  
In the same year, Orender also launched Orender Unlmited, a consulting and advisory firm based in Jacksonville, Florida.  This organization focuses on marketing, media, and diversity strategies for its clientele.  She has been the CEO since it launched in 2011.

Through both of her organizations, Orender has been invited to be the keynote and motivational speaker for many events around the nation.  She has also been a global ambassador for Vital Voices, traveling to India to help mentor young women entrepreneurs. In 2016, she gave a TEDx Talk presentation in Jacksonville, FL. In July 2018, Orender published a book titled WOWsdom! The Girl's Guide to the Positive and the Possible (Mascot Books, July 10, 2018).

Donna Orender has been appointed and elected to serve on several organizations' executive board committees:

 Monique Burr Foundation for Children (board member)
 V Foundation for Cancer Research (board member)
 United Jewish Appeal (UJA) Sports for Youth Initiative (co-chair)
 Brooks College of Health at the University of North Florida (advisory board)
 DeVos Graduate Sports Business Management program at the University of Central Florida (advisory board)
 World Surfing League (WSL) (founding board member, 2013)

Personal life 
In 1990, Orender moved from New York to Jacksonville Beach, Florida, where she resides with her husband. She is a member of the Jacksonville Jewish Center. She is a member of Sigma Gamma Rho.

Orender met her future husband Carnace (MG) Orender while both were working for PGA of America. MG has held several professional roles in the golf community such as president of Hamilton Golf, Inc. and many positions within the PGA America organization including PGA President from 2003 – 2004. The two were married in 1994 and have two children together, twin brothers Jacob and Zachary. Jacob is  a guard for the California Golden Bears basketball team. Zachary is completing his bachelor's degree at Tulane University. During her time as president of the WNBA, Orender lived and worked in New York, while her husband stayed in Jacksonville with the couple's children.

From her marriage, Orender is also mother to two stepchildren, Morgan and Colleen Orender.  Morgan is an associate attorney practicing law in Jacksonville, Florida, and Colleen is a singer based in Nashville, Tennessee.

Orender is friends with Ann Meyers Drysdale, whom she met in 1979 while playing in the WBL. The two played together for the New Jersey Gems.

Honors and awards 

 Fox Sports Network ranked Donna Orender in the top ten most powerful women in sports (2005) 
Sporting News's annual "Power List" in 2005
 Inducted into the National Jewish Sports Hall of Fame (2006) 
 March of Dimes Sports Leadership Award (2006) 
 Women in Sports and Events (WISE) Woman of the Year Award (2007)
Queens College Athletics Hall of Fame (2012)
 Elected to the International Jewish Sports Hall of Fame (2015) 
Business Week's Power 100 Sports issue
Honored by the UJA-Federation of New York's Entertainment, Media and Communications Division
 Youth for Sports, Chair
 Entertainment, Media & Communications Division Executive Committee, Vice Chair
Newsweek 100 Most Influential People in Sports

Writing 
During an interview in 2011 with Athlon Sports following her announcement that she would be stepping down as President of the WNBA, Orender mentioned writing a book among her professional goals. Orender has several writing credits to her name:

 My Dad and Me by Larry King, contributor
 WOWsdom! The Girl's Guide to the Positive and the Possible, author
 Barnstorming America Stories from the Pioneers of Women's Basketball, co-author
 The Leaderboard: Conversations on Golf and Life, contributor
 Articles published with Sports Illustrated, Street and Smith's Sports Business Journal, and The Times

See also
 List of select Jewish basketball players

Notes

References
Generation W 
 WBL

1957 births
Living people
21st-century American Jews
21st-century American women
Women's National Basketball Association commissioners
Basketball players from New York (state)
Jewish American sportspeople
Jewish women's basketball players
People from Long Island
Queens College, City University of New York alumni
Adelphi University alumni
Women in American professional sports management
American women's basketball coaches
Women basketball executives
Women's Professional Basketball League coaches
Women's Professional Basketball League players